Siam Air Transport Co.,Ltd., or Siam Air, was a Thai airline with its head office on the property of Don Mueang International Airport in Don Mueang District, Bangkok.  It operated services out of Don Mueang International Airport. 

The airline began operations in October 2014 with services out of Don Mueang to Hong Kong, using two Boeing 737-300s. Two Boeing 737-800s were added to its fleet in late 2015. It expanded by adding Zhengzhou and Guangzhou to its network in early 2015. In late 2015, the airline launched flights to Macau and Singapore. In 2019, the airline ceased all operations.

Destinations
China
Changsha - Changsha Huanghua International Airport
Guangzhou - Guangzhou Baiyun International Airport
Zhengzhou - Zhengzhou Xinzheng International Airport

Hong Kong
Hong Kong - Hong Kong International Airport

Macau
Macau - Macau International Airport

Singapore
Singapore - Singapore Changi Airport

Thailand
Bangkok - Don Mueang International Airport (Hub)

Fleet

Siam Air fleet consisted of the following aircraft:

References

External links
Siam Air Transport Co., Ltd. Official website

Defunct airlines of Thailand
Airlines established in 2010
Airlines disestablished in 2017
Defunct low-cost airlines
Companies based in Bangkok
2017 disestablishments in Thailand
Thai companies established in 2010